The 1947 Detroit Titans football team represented the University of Detroit as an independent during the 1947 college football season. Detroit outscored its opponents by a combined total of 276 to 154 and finished with a 6–4 record in its third year under head coach Chuck Baer. Bob Greiner and Joe Wright were the team captains.

Schedule

Roster

See also
 1947 in Michigan

References

External links
 1947 University of Detroit football programs

Detroit
Detroit Titans football seasons
Detroit Titans football
Detroit Titans football